The Supreme Court of Korea is the highest ordinary court in the judicial branch of South Korea, seated in Seocho, Seoul. Established under Chapter 5 of the Constitution of South Korea, the Court has ultimate and comprehensive jurisdiction over all cases except those cases falling under the jurisdiction of the Constitutional Court of Korea. It consists of fourteen Justices, including the Chief Justice of the Supreme Court of Korea. The Supreme Court is at the top of the hierarchy of all ordinary courts in South Korea, and traditionally represented the conventional judiciary of South Korea. The Supreme Court has equivalent status as one of the two highest courts in South Korea. The other is the Constitutional Court of Korea.

History and Status 

The original constitution during the First Republic established 'Supreme Court' and 'Constitutional Committee' in Chapter 5. The Supreme Court was established as the highest ordinary court but lacked the power of constitutional review, which was conferred upon the Constitutional Committee, a sort of constitutional court. This distribution of judicial power inside judiciary was never fully realized under rule of South Korea's first president Syngman Rhee, whose dictatorship hampered the Committee's function and eventually left it unable to re-constitute itself. Though the Supreme Court had no power of judicial review, it enjoyed judicial independence under the first Chief Justice of the Supreme Court, 'Kim Byung-ro', from 1948 to 1957. Renowned for his ardent participation in Korean independence movement during the Japanese colonial rule, Chief Justice Kim Byung-ro famously defended the independence of the judiciary from Syngman Rhee.

However, after Kim Byung-ro's retirement in 1957, the Supreme Court fell to autocratic influence. By giving the death sentence to Park's political contender Cho Bong-am in 1959 and also by sentencing death on the defendants of People's Revolutionary Party Incident in 1975 under Park Chung-hee's era, the Supreme Court gained notorious reputation for judicial murder as obediently sentencing capital punishments over spy scandals fabricated by dictators. After the April Revolution, the Constitutional Court was established to replace the Constitutional Committee, but the Supreme Court remained largely unaffected by the changes. After Park Chung-hee's 1961 coup, the Second Republic was dissolved and, after a nominal transition to civilian rule from a military junta, the Third Republic was established in 1962. The Constitutional Court, itself never formed because of the coup, was abolished while the power of judicial review was conferred on the Supreme Court. Nevertheless, the Supreme Court retained its deference towards the ruling dictator. In 1971, the Supreme Court resisted the oppressive rule of President Park Chung-hee and declared Article 2 of the National Compensation Act unconstitutional, a statute that limited state liability for injured soldiers during service. President Park retaliated by refusing reappointment of Supreme Court Justices, which had been a formality. The Fourth and Fifth Republics would endow a new, differently-formed Constitutional Committee with the power of constitutional review but on the condition that a court first formally submit a request before the Committee could hear a case. This extra procedural hurdle was meant to nullify the Committee, since the Supreme Court would never authorize such requests, while allowing the Park Chung-hee regime to maintain the pretense that it granted the Committee full constitutional-review power. It effectively allowed the military junta to act with impunity. Following 1987 democratization, the Constitutional Court was restored in the Sixth Republic, with the power of constitutional review. To prevent the president from undermining the judiciary again, the 1987 constitutional amendment, which established the Sixth Republic, allows citizens to file a constitutional complaint directly with the Constitutional Court, even if courts refuse to do so.

In 2015, the Organisation for Economic Co-operation and Development ranked the South Korean ordinary judiciary to be one of the most efficient in terms of trial length and trial costs.

Composition

Justices 
Since the current Constitution of South Korea doesn't specify the exact number of Supreme Court justices, the number of justices is stipulated by the statute called the Court Organization Act on the organization of ordinary courts. Currently in 2022, the number of justices is 14 by article 4(2) of the Act. All of the Supreme Court justices are appointed by the President of South Korea with the consent of the National Assembly, according to article 104(2) of the Constitution. It is notable that article 104(2) of the Constitution also empowers the Chief Justice of the Supreme Court to recommend candidates for Supreme Court justice. To be appointed as Supreme Court justice, one should be at least 45 years old, qualified as an attorney at law, and also should have more than 20 years of experience in legal practice or academia, by article 42(1) of the Act.

Council of Supreme Court Justices 
Article 104(2) of the Constitution requires consent of 'Council of Supreme Court Justices' for appointment of lower ordinary courts Judges by Chief Justice of the Supreme Court. The council is composed of all Supreme Court Justices (including the Chief Justice), and can make decision by simple majority among quorum of two-thirds of all Supreme Court Justices, according to article 16(1), (2) and (3) of the Court Organization Act. When the vote ties, the Chief Justice has casting vote as permanent presiding chair at the council. Also empowered by article 17 of the Act, the council has also other supervisory functions for the Chief Justice's power of court administration, such as promulgation of interior procedural rules, selection of judicial precedents for publication and fiscal planning for all ordinary courts including the Supreme Court itself.

Chief Justice of the Supreme Court 

By article 104(1) of the Constitution, the Chief Justice of the Supreme Court is appointed by the President of South Korea with the consent of the National Assembly. The experience and age requirements for the Chief Justice are the same as that of the associate Supreme Court justices under article 42(1) of the Court Organization Act.

The Chief Justice's role is more than being the presiding member of the Grand Bench, composed of more than two-thirds of all fourteen justices. The Chief nominates candidates for three of the nine Constitutional Court justices under article 111(3) of Constitution and serves as chair at the Council of Supreme Court Justices. Also, the Chief appoints one of the associate Supreme Court justices as Minister of National Court Administration and appoints all ordinary lower court judges with the consent of the Council of Supreme Court Justices.

Tenure 
Article 105(1), (2) and (4) of the Constitution and article 45(4) of the Court Organization Act provides the term of associate Justices as renewable six-year up to mandatory retirement age of 70. However, there's no Justices who attempted to renew their term by reappointment in current Sixth Republic, because renewing attempt can harm judicial independence of the Court. During the term, according to article 106(2) of the Constitution, Justices shall not be expelled from office unless by impeachment or a sentence of imprisonment. Also, participating in any political party or activities are prohibited by article 43(1), 49 of the Act.

A noteworthy point of South Korean Supreme Court Justices is they can be retired from office against their will while in term, when they are regarded as having unbearable mental or physical impairment. This 'order' of retirement by President of South Korea due to impairment of Supreme Court Justice is clearly stipulated in article 106(2) of the Constitution and article 47 of the Act. Other lower ordinary court Judges can also be ordered to retire due to impairment by Supreme Court Chief Justice. This is retirement order system is one of major difference between Supreme Court Justice and Constitutional Court Justice; the latter cannot be ordered to retire because of impairment, as there are no statute supporting such retirement order system in the Constitutional Court Act.

Current justices

Organization

Research judges 
Judges in Research division of the Supreme Court (formerly known as 'Research Judges' or 'Judicial Researchers') are officials supporting Supreme Court Justices. By article 24(3) of the Act, there are two types of Research Judges; One is originally lower ordinary court Judges seconded to the Supreme Court by order of Chief Justice, another is experts who are not lower ordinary court Judges. The latter is called 'Judicial Researchers' and appointed for maximum term of 3 years, while former is called 'Research Judges' and usually seconded to work in the Supreme Court for 1 to 2 years. This system is influenced by German 'Research Associates' who are originally lower court judges seconded to federal courts up to five years, working as judicial assistant for judges in highest courts. Though working term for these research staffs are short, they are core staffs who operates whole procedure of the Court, since there are too many of cases appealed to the Court. The number of Research Judges are currently around 100, while number of Judicial Researchers are around 30.

National Court Administration 
Established as apparatus of the Supreme Court under article 67 of the Court Organization Act, the 'National Court Administration' (NCA) manages all of matters on administration of all ordinary courts (including the Supreme Court itself) in South Korea. The head of the NCA is called 'Minister of NCA' and solely appointed by the Chief Justice among associate Supreme Court Justices. As other Supreme Court Justices, the Minister is treated as same level as other Ministers at State Council in executive branch of South Korean government. Also the Vice Minister of NCA is appointed by the Chief Justice usually from senior lower court Judges and treated as same level as other Vice-Ministers. The NCA follows direction of the Chief Justice and implements decisions from the Council of Supreme Court Justices. Its main role includes assisting the Chief Justice's power on human resource issues of lower ordinary court Judges, planning fiscal budget and expenditure issues for all ordinary courts, and internal inspection for anti-corruption ethics.

Judicial Research and Training Institute 

The 'Judicial Research and Training Institute' (JRTI) is currently an institution for training and reeducating lower ordinary court Judges by article 72 of the Court Organization Act. However, it was originally a kind of nation-wide 2-year law school supported by South Korean government before South Korea adopted American styled 3-year law school system in year 2008. Before South Korea adopted American law school system, South Korea trained its legal professionals mainly by JRTI. Another route was recruitment by South Korean Armed Forces as 'Judge Advocates'.

The JRTI was basically a South Korean conversion of 'Legal Research and Training Institute' in Japan, which was an institution for training judges, prosecutors and attorneys-at-laws at the same time. The trainees at JRTI was selected by a nation-wide exam on jurisprudence called 'Judicial exam'. These trainees were commonly trained and competed against each other in the JRTI for 2 years, as their career option after graduation was restricted according to graduation records of JRTI. Graduated trainee with superior records usually choose to become Judges and Prosecutors, while trainees with lower records had to choose working as lawyers in fields. This partially continued civil law tradition of regarding prosecutors as de facto part of judiciary, like French National School for the Judiciary, is reflected in organization of JRTI, as the deputy director (or vice-president) of the JRTI is appointed among Prosecutors by article 74(1) of the Act. Yet after American styled 3-year law school system was adopted in South Korea, the JRTI lost its status as only professional school for law in South Korea, and turned into internal education institute for newly appointed Judges and Law clerks. Some of senior Judges are also retrained in JRTI for technical matters. Also, currently all of training functions for Prosecutors are transferred to 'Institute of Justice' at Ministry of Justice.

Judicial Policy Research Institute 
Established by article 76-2 of the Court Organization Act in year 2014, the 'Judicial Policy Research Institute' (JPRI) is apparatus of the Supreme Court for research on policy issues concerning judicial system of South Korea. It also has function for educating public on elementary issues on function of ordinary courts. Research fellows and Researchers at the Institute are recruited mainly from lower ordinary courts Judges, yet significant number of Researchers are recruited from outside of ordinary courts usually with PhD degrees, by article 76-4 of the Act. The JPRI is currently located in Goyang, Gyeonggi.

Building 

The Supreme Court was located in Seosomun-dong of Jung-gu, Seoul until year 1995. Currently, it is located in Seocho, Seoul. The Supreme Court building in Seocho has 16 floors and two underground floors with total space around 66,500 square meters. This large size building was necessary to hold the Supreme Court, National Court Administration and law library all together. Main Center of the building is mainly used by the Supreme Court, while east Wing is maily used by National Court Administration. Other Wing is used by law library. At the center entrance of the building, three Korean words are engraved;  meaning freedom,  meaning equality, and  meaning Justice. The Supreme Court usually does not hold open hearing session, though sessions for verdicts are regularly held on the second and last Thursday of a month.

Jurisdiction 
Empowered by article 101(2) and 110(2) of the Constitution, the Supreme Court has comprehensive final appellate jurisdiction over all ordinary courts and military courts cases. It can also exercise power of judicial review on sub-statutory level as other ordinary courts according to article 107(2) of the Constitution. It is notable that some of cases are handled only in the Supreme Court as single-tiered trial without possibility of appeal. This kind of single-tiered trial cases include dispute on election of President of South Korea, National Assembly members, and Provincial-level local governors and local parliament members according to article 222 and 223 of the Public Official Election Act. Another example of single-tiered trial case at the Supreme Court is case on discipline of Judge's misconduct, under article 27(2) of the Discipline Of Judges Act.

Procedure 
By article 7(1) of the Court Organization Act, the Supreme Court handles final appellate cases in two different phases. One is 'Petty Bench' which is a small panel inside the Court presided by most senior Justice inside the Petty Bench, and the other is 'Grand Bench' which is an en banc of the Court which is always presided by the Chief Justice.

Petty Bench and Grand Bench 
In the first phase, the 'Petty Bench' composed of four Supreme Court Justices reviews how appeal should be handled. If the four Justices in the same Petty Bench makes decision unanimously, the case is decided in the Petty Bench. However, when the Petty Bench cannot make unanimous decision by itself, or when the Petty Bench decides such case should be handled in en banc (for example, if it is necessary to change precedent of the Supreme Court, or if constitutional review at sub-statutory level is important issue of the case, etc.), the Grand Bench takes the case. Since there is three petty benches in the Court, only twelve out of fourteen Supreme Court Justices are participating in the first phase of the procedure. Other two Supreme Court Justices who are not belonged to any Petty Bench, are the Chief Justice and the Minister of National Court Administration, both having administrative role inside the Court. In the second phase, the 'Grand Bench' composed of more than two-thirds of all Supreme Court Justices reviews the case came up from the Petty Bench. It makes decision by simple majority. However, if there's no majority opinion in the Bench, opinion of the Court is decided according to article 66 of the Act.

Presiding Justice and Justice in charge 
In South Korea, among panel of Judges or Justices, there should be 'presiding member' and 'member in charge'. The presiding member is official representative of the panel. The member in charge is who oversees hearing and trial and writes draft judgment for each specific case. This role of 'member in charge' is mostly similar to Judge-Rapporteur in European Court of Justice. Usually the member in charge is automatically (or randomly) selected by computer to negate suspicion of partiality. However, the presiding member is bureaucratically selected by seniority. Due to this virtual difference in role, 'presiding Judge' in South Korean courts usually refer to which means such Judge is bureaucratically regarded as 'head of the panel', not who really takes role of presiding member in each of specific cases.

Case naming 
Current cases in the Supreme Court are named as following rule. First two or four digit Arabic numbers indicate the year when the case is filed. And the following case code composed of Alphabets matches with specific jurisdiction (for example, 'Da' is for private law cases, while 'Du' is for criminal law cases) of the Court. The last serial number is given in the order of case filing of each year.

Statistics 
Approximately, the Supreme Court receives about 35,000 ~ 48,000 appeal cases per year from year 2011 to 2020. Yet South Korean Supreme Court has no legal power to select reviewable case by discretion, so it cannot make 'permission to appeal'. Rather, every cases appealed to the Supreme Court should be decided at least in level of Petty Bench composed of four Supreme Court Justices. This unique institutional structure increases workload of the Supreme Court seriously. For example, while the Supreme Court makes decision on about 35,000 ~ 50,000 cases per year, only 10 ~ 20 cases are decided at the Grand Bench per year. Even former Supreme Court Justice Park Sihwan confessed in his own article after retirement, that much of cases in the Petty Bench are deliberated for only '3 to 4 minutes', which makes role of Research Judges in the Court significantly important.

Whether how to reform this system is still remained in South Korea as controversy among increasing number of Justices, empowering the Court with discretion of 'permission to appeal', or establishing another 'appellate court' which only deals with second-rate important final appeal cases abandoned from the Supreme Court. This was one of the reason that former Chief Justice Yang Sung-tae tried to interfere in lower court judgments to get endorsement on foundation of 'appellate court' from former President of South Korea, Park Geun-hye, as Yang opposed to increasing number of Supreme Court Justices as since it can harm previlieges of Justices.

Criticism and Issues 
 The Supreme Court's fame and trust is again gradually deteriorating again in contemporary South Korea, due to social concerns on unfairly lenient attitude toward establishments like Chaebol and embarrassing political struggle inside the hierarchy of ordinary courts such as case-rigging scandal of 15th Chief Justice Yang Sung-tae.
 Both Constitution and the Court Organization Act have no contingency plan for massive vacancy of the Supreme Court. Thus, when the National Assembly refuses to make consent on appointment of Supreme Court Justices by article 104(1) and (2) of the Constitution, there is no other option and the Supreme Court is paralyzed by vacancy of Justices. While this problem is also happening in the Constitutional Court of Korea, the problem of the Supreme Court is lighter than that of Constitutional Court, because the Supreme Court only requires simple majority for any decision by article 66(1) of the Act. Yet the Constitutional Court should have more at least six Justices to make upholding decision by article 113(1) of the Constitution.

See also

 Chief Justice of the Supreme Court of Korea
 Politics of South Korea
 Government of South Korea
 Judiciary of South Korea
 Constitutional Court of Korea

References

External links
 the Supreme Court of Korea Official Website
 The Constitution of the Republic of Korea (translated in English), Korea Legislation Research Institute
 Court Organization Act (translated in English), Korea Legislation Research Institute
 2019 Introductory Book of the Supreme Court of Korea, published and downloadable by the Supreme Court of Korea

Judiciary of South Korea
Korea, South
Courts in South Korea
Law of South Korea
1948 establishments in South Korea
Courts and tribunals established in 1948
Seocho District